Rina Amiri (born ) is an Afghan-born American diplomat and activist serving as the U.S. Special Envoy for Afghan Women, Girls and Human Rights since January 6, 2022. She served as senior advisor to the U.S. Special Representative for Afghanistan and Pakistan under the Obama administration, has served in the United Nations in several peace building capacities, and has held senior positions in programs at Harvard, Princeton, and New York University.  She has provided political analysis and commentary on MSNBC, PBS, CNN, and CSPAN, and was recognized as 125 Women of Impact by Newsweek.

Early life and education
Amiri was born  in Afghanistan. In 1973, at four years old, she became a refugee when her parents left secretly through the Khyber Pass out of Afghanistan and into Pakistan. They later moved to Mumbai before settling in California. 

In 2007, Amiri completed a masters of arts in law and diplomacy, mediation, and international relations at the Fletcher School of Law and Diplomacy.

Career
In 2002, Amiri experienced a life-changing event when United States Senator John Kerry spoke at a forum at the Fletcher School of Law and Diplomacy at Tufts University after the September 11 attacks in 2001, and opened the floor to questions. She attracted the attention of the media when she stood up and said that "The color of our hair and our skin does not reflect what is in our hearts and minds...The Afghan population is not the Taliban. They have been the first victims of the Taliban."

She subsequently became a sought-after expert and speaker on Afghanistan. Amiri has been interviewed by national media outlets such as CNN and National Public Radio; appeared on NewsHour With Jim Lehrer on PBS; and been profiled in Boston and New England TV programs. She has been quoted by major newspapers across the country, and an op-ed she wrote was published in The New York Times. While she has insisted on keeping attention focused on issues related to the conflict in Afghanistan, rather than on herself personally, she has discussed her dual identity as an American who identifies strongly with Afghan culture.

Amiri was an advisor to Richard Holbrooke, who served as a special advisor to President Barack Obama on Afghanistan and Pakistan. In 2015, she appeared in the documentary film The Diplomat about the life of Holbrooke, filmed after his death.

On December 29, 2021, U.S. Secretary of State Antony Blinken announced the appointment of Amiri as special envoy for Afghan women, girls, and human rights. She took office on January 6, 2022. The appointment came as women in the country were facing increased oppression by the ruling Taliban. She has also worked to raise international awareness of the plight of Afghan refugees who have been "stranded everywhere" and face years of uncertainty.

In October 2022 Amiri highlighted that it was 400 days since girls in Afghanistan were allowed to go to secondary school by the Taliban government. She noted that the country was unlikely to thrive while it denied 50% of its population an education. The government said it was considering opening up education for girls above year sixm but no date was offered.

References

External links
 

Living people
Afghan refugees
Refugees in Pakistan
United States Special Envoys
Afghan emigrants to the United States
The Fletcher School at Tufts University alumni
Obama administration personnel
American women diplomats
1969 births